The 2016 Western Athletic Conference women's soccer tournament is the postseason women's soccer tournament for the Western Athletic Conference to be held from November 3 to November 6, 2016. The five match tournament will be held at Durwood Soccer Stadium in Kansas City. The six team single-elimination tournament will consist of three rounds based on seeding from regular season conference play. The defending champions are the Utah Valley Wolverines, who defeated the Seattle Redhawks 2–0 in the 2015 tournament.

Bracket

Schedule

First round

Semifinals

Final

All-Tournament team

References 

tournament 2016
Western Athletic Conference Women's Soccer